Half Moon Investigations is a novel by the Irish author Eoin Colfer. It was first published in United States in March 2006 and was released in the UK and Ireland on 1 June 2006. The paperback edition was released in the UK on 5 July 2007. It has also been adapted as a television series starring Marcus Nash & Rory Elrick, aired on the BBC from January 2009.

Plot summary
Fletcher Moon (often called "Half-Moon" due to his short stature) is a natural born investigator. Knowing this, April, a girl from his school comes to him for help in finding a lock of hair that she believes to have been stolen. Fletcher agrees to help her and starts off by investigating all suspects which eventually gets him threatened by a thirteen-year-old named Red Sharkey. Fletcher is a graduate from the Bernsteins Academy, so he is a "certified" detective.

While Fletcher is investigating the stolen lock of hair he has a hurling stick thrown at him and is seriously injured. Fletcher holds Red as a prime suspect as the hurling stick had 'Red' embossed on it and comes to the conclusion that it was Red who attacked him. Fletcher then goes to visit April’s cousin May to photograph this newfound evidence but ends up at the wrong house where he catches sight of somebody setting fire to May’s lucky dancing costume.

He passes out in the yard due to the anesthetic from the hospital and later awakens to find a torch in his hand and all evidence for the arson pointing to him. Following an interrogation by the police, Fletcher is rescued by Red Sharkey. Red claims he was framed for the hurl assault.

Half-Moon and Red team up to solve the chain of mysteries within 24 hours. Following a suspicious story to April's house, the boy detectives discover the truth behind Les Jeunes Etudiantes, the girls club, their true goal being to get rid of all the boys ruining their education. Three recent expulsions can be attributed to these girls, and the boys feel they need to be stopped. 
Unfortunately, they are found out, and the girls manage to imprison the boys in the cellar. They are, however, saved by May, April's cousin. Fletcher and Red previously heard the girls practicing the lines that they planned to use to accuse Red's brother, Herod of assault. Red is able to send a text message to the present police officer informing him of the lines they would use.

The police officer puts two and two together and exposes the girls as liars, and Herod Sharkey is found innocent, saving him from expulsion. April, being caught, attempts to escape in her father's car but promptly crashes into the police cruiser. However, Fletcher is informed (by text from the officer) that this still does not solve the mysteries that included his assault so he meets a secret informant, and in exchange for the password of the police account he hacked earlier in the story, receives the information that he desires.

He finds that the link between the crimes ended up being the upcoming talent show at his school and it turns out that the victims each had a part in the show in some way. After trying to protect May from becoming involved with the criminal Fletcher at last finds the answer he had been looking for all along. All the victims of these crimes had been ranked higher than May in the talent show. So, Red suggests that May was behind all this. However, on stage, Fletcher proves that it was May's father, Gregor Devereux who was the culprit.

In the epilogue, Red and Fletcher decide to form a detective group. Red suggests "Moon Investigations" while Fletcher replies by saying "You're half right", referencing his nickname and the title of the book.

Critical reception
Newsround called the book "really exciting" and said "Once you've read page one you'll be hooked to Eoin Colfer's Books".

Sequel
In an interview on 27 September 2007, Colfer admitted he had a rough idea for a second Half Moon book in which Moon goes undercover with a group of goths and listens to Kate Bush and Metallica. He said would find it interesting to expand on the history of Hazel - Moon's sister.

Television adaptation
In 2008, BBC announced a series called Half Moon Investigations to replace Grange Hill. A single 13 episode series later aired.

References

External links

2006 Irish novels
Novels by Eoin Colfer
Irish mystery novels
Children's mystery novels
Irish children's novels
2006 children's books
Fictional amateur detectives
Fictional private investigators